Piszczac  is a village in Biała Podlaska County, Lublin Voivodeship, in eastern Poland. In 1530–1869, it was a town  mentioned in old chronicles and in the census of 1566, as Pieszczatka. Today it is the seat of the gmina (administrative district) called Gmina Piszczac.

The village has a population of 2,087.

References

Villages in Biała Podlaska County
Brest Litovsk Voivodeship
Siedlce Governorate
Kholm Governorate
Lublin Voivodeship (1919–1939)